Alina Jidkova and Tatiana Perebiynis were the defending champions, but none entered this year. Perebiynis opted to rest in order to compete at Indian Wells the following week.

Anna-Lena Grönefeld and Meghann Shaughnessy won the title by defeating Shinobu Asagoe and Émilie Loit 6–1, 6–3 in the final.

Seeds

Draw

Draw

Qualifying

Qualifying seeds

Qualifiers
  Sara Errani /  Arantxa Parra Santonja

Qualifying draw

References

External links
 Official results archive (ITF)
 Official results archive (WTA)

2006 Abierto Mexicano Telcel
Abierto Mexicano Telcel